Michael Dawson  is a businessman and former politician from County Dublin in Ireland. He is the founder and CEO of Gift Voucher Shop.

Career 
Dawson served briefly as a senator in 1989, when he was nominated by the Taoiseach to the 18th Seanad to fill a vacancy after the 1989 general election.

In 2002, he founded he Gift Voucher Shop (GVS), an international company that created the Multi-Retailer Gift Card. 

Dawson was one of finalists in the 2007 Ernst & Young Entrepreneur of the Year programme. In 2010, he was named 'Fingal Business Person of the Year' at the Business Excellence Awards 2010.  

In November 2018, Dawson sold his share of the Gift Voucher Shop to Fintech Blackhawk Network when the company purchased the One4all gift voucher business.

Personal life 
He lives in Malahide, County Dublin. Dawson was married to Pauline and together they had three sons. Pauline died in 2014 from cancer.

References

Year of birth missing (living people)
Living people
Businesspeople from County Dublin
Irish chief executives
Members of the 18th Seanad
Politicians from County Dublin
Fianna Fáil senators
Nominated members of Seanad Éireann